Zhongshan Soccer Stadium, Chungshan Soccer Stadium, or Taipei Soccer Stadium was a multi-purpose stadium in Zhongshan District, Taipei, Taiwan. It was established in 1923 as  during the Japanese period. The soccer stadium was opened in 1989, it was reconstructed from the former site of Yuanshan Baseball Ground under the guidance of then Chinese Taipei Football Association President Chiang Wei-kuo. Although it was built as a soccer-specific stadium, it was mostly used for live concerts or other activities due to lack of professional football league in Taiwan. The stadium was able to hold 20,000 people for football games and 40,000 for concerts. It was managed by the Hope Foundation led by former athlete Chi Cheng.

Location
Zhongshan Soccer Stadium was located across of Yumen Street and Minzu West Road. Nearby was the Yuanshan Station of Taipei Metro (Tamsui Line, Red Line)

Events
The stadium has hosted a number of concerts by internationally renowned music stars. The King of Pop Michael Jackson performed two sold-out concerts at the stadium on October 18 and 22 1996, during his History World Tour (attendance : 98.000). Bon Jovi performed at the stadium on April 28, 1995, during These Days Tour. Australian pop star Kylie Minogue performed there on December 4, 2008, as part of her KylieX2008 world tour.

Closure
In March 2007, Taipei City Government announced that Yuanshan will be replacing Guandu Plain as the main venue of the 2010 International Garden and Horticulture Exhibition to be hosted in Taipei. In their plan, Chungshan Soccer Stadium, being one of the major parts of the Yuanshan area, would serve as the primary venue of the exhibition featuring indoor activities. As a result, the stadium was closed on July 1, 2008.

However, the Chinese Taipei Football Association made a statement in its official site on June 29, 2007, opposing the proposal. They stated that Chungshan Soccer Stadium was the only FIFA-approved stadium in Taiwan at present. If it is closed, Taiwan (Chinese Taipei) would lose its home ground and would not be allowed to hold international football competitions.

Though there were several ongoing construction projects for new stadiums, including the World Games Stadium for World Games 2009 in Kaohsiung and the new Taipei Municipal Stadium for 2009 Summer Deaflympics in Taipei. But both cannot be complete prior to the end of 2008.

On September 30, 2007, Taipei City Mayor Hau Lung-pin committed to delay the stadium's closing schedule to the end of 2008 for hosting 2010 FIFA World Cup qualification and 2008 AFC Challenge Cup qualifiers. The stadium was closed on November 28, 2008.

Transportation
The stadium was accessible within walking distance South East from Yuanshan Station of the Taipei Metro.

Gallery

References

External links

 Chungshan Soccer Stadium 
 Zhongshan Soccer Stadium at Taipei Sports Office official site
 Pictures at World Stadiums
 StadiumDB.com pictures

1989 establishments in Taiwan
2008 disestablishments in Taiwan
Former buildings and structures in Taiwan